"Somebody" is the debut single from Surinamese-Dutch singer Natalie La Rose featuring American singer Jeremih. The song was written by La Rose and produced by The Futuristics and Cook Classics. An audio version of the song was first uploaded onto YouTube on December 22, 2014. It was then released for digital download on January 6, 2015.

Musically, "Somebody" is an electro-R&B song that makes use of synthesizers and heavy drum instrumentation. The song interpolates "I Wanna Dance with Somebody (Who Loves Me)" by Whitney Houston, "Do You Really Wanna Know" by Lillix written by Marcel Albert, and "Shots" by LMFAO and Lil Jon.

The single reached the number one position on Billboards Rhythmic Airplay chart in its April 4, 2015 issue. On the Billboard Hot 100, the song peaked at number ten, making it Jeremih's fourth top-ten hit and La Rose's first. The single was certified double platinum by the Recording Industry Association of America for sales exceeding 2,000,000 copies. It also charted at number two on the UK Singles Chart, and was awarded Silver certification by the British Phonographic Industry. In Australia, the song peaked at number 12 and was certified platinum, denoting sales exceeding 70,000 copies.

The accompanying music video, directed by Luke Gilford, was uploaded to La Rose's Vevo account on February 13, 2015. It features La Rose leading her dancers in front of an old mansion while also singing the song in a garden with a rose-covered fence and statues with strange lighting, with intercut scenes of Jeremih singing his part.

Background and composition
The song contains interpolations of Whitney Houston's 1987 hit "I Wanna Dance with Somebody (Who Loves Me)", "Do You Really Wanna Know" by Lillix written by Marcel Albert, and "Shots" by LMFAO and Lil Jon. La Rose explained how the song came about: "We had the whole song except for the hook. Hours later, Flo all of a sudden was like, 'I wanna rock with somebody!' And we were like, 'Yes! That's the moment we've been waiting for, it all makes sense.'" 
She also said: "We had this idea to base a song around Whitney’s first big hit, I Wanna Dance With Somebody. Getting permission to use a sample was pretty difficult. We were in the process of creating the song in Miami when Jeremih was there doing a Big Dreams for Kids Back to School event. Flo invited him to add a rap to the track and he nailed it on the first take. There was no grand plan to get Jeremih involved. He just happened to be in Miami at the right time. His rap adds that extra something which makes the track really special."

Track listing

Remix 
The official remix was released on April 8, 2015. It features original collaborator Jeremih and new verses from rappers Fetty Wap, Sage the Gemini and Troy Ave.
There is also another remix, called the "Young California Remix", that features original vocals from singer Jeremih and the vocals of rapper Sage the Gemini and The Kid Ryan.

Charts

Weekly charts

Year-end charts

Certifications

References

Natalie La Rose songs
2014 songs
Jeremih songs
Republic Records singles
2014 debut singles
Song recordings produced by the Futuristics
Songs written by Jeremih
Songs written by Joe Khajadourian
Songs written by Alex Schwartz
Songs written by Cook Classics
Songs written by Shannon Rubicam
Songs written by George Merrill (songwriter)